Auhah Island is a small island belonging to Kuwait. Apart from a lighthouse and a small heliport, the island is  uninhabited.

See also
List of lighthouses in Kuwait

References

External links
 Picture of Auhah Island

Uninhabited islands of Kuwait
Lighthouses in Kuwait